Golden Bridge (Narmada Bridge) is a bridge in India.

Golden Bridge may also refer to:
Golden Bridge (Germany) (Goldene Brücke), heritage-protected pedestrian bridge in Düsseldorf (Hofgarten)
Golden Bridge (Vietnam) (Cầu Vàng), pedestrian bridge near Da Nang, Vietnam
Golden Bridge (Russia) (Zolotoy Bridge), traffic bridge in Vladivostok, Russia
The Golden Bridge (German: Die goldene Brücke), West German drama film

See also
Goldenbridge (disambiguation)
Golden Gate Bridge
Goldens Bridge, New York
Goldens Bridge station
Gold Bridge, an unincorporated community in Bridge River Country, British Columbia, Canada